Navas is a neighborhood in the Sant Andreu district of Barcelona, Catalonia (Spain).

References

Neighbourhoods of Barcelona
Sant Andreu